The Gagarin Mountains are a linear group of mountains, trending in a north–south direction for  between the Kurze Mountains and the Conrad Mountains of the Orvin Mountains in Queen Maud Land, East Antarctica.

Discovery and naming
The Gagarin Mountains were mapped by cartographers of the Norwegian Polar Institute, using aerial photographs and surveys taken by the Sixth Norwegian Antarctic Expedition in 1956–60. They were remapped from surveys and air photos by the Soviet Antarctic Expedition, 1960–61, and named for Soviet astronaut Yuri Gagarin.

See also
 List of mountains of Queen Maud Land

References

External links
 Scientific Committee on Antarctic Research (SCAR)

Mountain ranges of Queen Maud Land
Orvin Mountains